Hugh Simon Torrens (born 1940) is a British historian of geology and paleontology, and Emeritus Professor of History of Science and Technology at Keele University.

Torrens received a bachelor's degree from the University of Oxford and a PhD from the University of Leicester.

He was president of the Society for the History of Natural History from 2012 to 2015, when he was succeeded by Arthur MacGregor.

He was awarded the Sue Tyler Friedman Medal by the Geological Society in 1991.

References

External links
Publications by H.S. Torrens 1964-2017

1940 births
Living people
Alumni of the University of Leicester
Alumni of the University of Oxford
Academics of Keele University
British paleoanthropologists
British geologists